Nitasha Kaul is a London based academic, writer and poet. In addition to fiction, she writes and speaks about topics that cover the political economy, Bhutan, Kashmir, nationalism in India, gender and identity.

Early life and education 
Kaul born and raised in Delhi, India to a Kashmiri Pandit family and She had her schooling at St. Thomas School. Kaul moved to England at the age of 21 in 1997.
She graduated in Economics from Sri Ram College of Commerce before pursuing her post-graduate from University of Hull; Kaul went on to earn her doctorate in Economics and Philosophy from Hull, in 2003. Her doctoral thesis was Interrogating the Subject-World of Economic Epistemology: Re-Imagining Theory and Difference.

Career 
Kaul served as a Lecturer of Economics at University of Bath and as an Assistant Professor of Economics at the Bristol Business School from 2002 to 2007 before being made Associate Professor in Creative Writing at the Royal Thimphu College in Bhutan (2010). At present, she is an Associate Professor in Politics and International Relations at the University of Westminster. Her current scholarly interests include feminist issues concerning Kashmiri women, the rise of muscular neo-liberal nationalism in India, and an analysis of right-wing politics in India.

On October 22, 2019, Kaul served as one of the key witnesses at a United States House Committee on Foreign Affairs hearing about the human rights situation in Indian-administered Kashmir, following the revocation of special status within India. Kaul outlined extensive UNHCHR reports about the violations of human rights (and democratic principles) in both Indian and Pakistan-administered Kashmir along with the recent clampdown on communication facilities and mass-detention in the Indian territory.

Books 
Her first book Imagining Economics Otherwise: encounters with Identity/Difference (2007), was a monograph on economics and philosophy and was subject to mixed reception.

In 2009 she wrote Residue, which was the first novel in English by a Kashmiri woman and was shortlisted for the 2009 Man Asian Literary Prize.

Bibliography 
 Residue. New Delhi: Rainlight, 2014 	
 November Light: An Anthology of Creative Writing from Bhutan	
 Imagining Economics Otherwise: Encounters with Identity/difference. London: Routledge, 2008

Awards 	
 Man Asian Literary Prize, 2009, shortlisted

References

External links 
 
 Nitasha Kaul at opendemocracy.net

1976 births
Living people
21st-century Indian novelists
Kashmiri writers
Indian women novelists
Indian women poets
Indian political writers
Indian sociologists
Indian women sociologists
21st-century Indian women writers
21st-century Indian non-fiction writers
21st-century Indian educational theorists
21st-century Indian women scientists
Novelists from Jammu and Kashmir
21st-century Indian poets
Women writers from Jammu and Kashmir
Scholars from Jammu and Kashmir
Poets from Jammu and Kashmir
21st-century Indian social scientists
Women educators from Jammu and Kashmir
Educators from Jammu and Kashmir
21st-century women educators
Writers about the Kashmir conflict